Events from the year 1947 in the United States.

Incumbents

Federal Government 
 President: Harry S. Truman (D-Missouri)
 Vice President: vacant
 Chief Justice: Fred M. Vinson (Kentucky)
 Speaker of the House of Representatives: Sam Rayburn (D-Texas) (until January 3), Joseph William Martin, Jr. (R-Massachusetts) (starting January 3)
 Senate Majority Leader: Alben W. Barkley (D-Kentucky) (until January 3), Wallace H. White, Jr. (R-Maine) (starting January 3)
 Congress: 79th (until January 3), 80th (starting January 3)

Events

January–March
 January 15 – Elizabeth Short, an aspiring actress nicknamed the "Black Dahlia", is found brutally murdered in a vacant lot in Los Angeles. The case is never solved.
 February 3 – P.L. Prattis becomes the first African American news correspondent allowed in the House of Representatives and Senate press galleries.
 February 17 – Cold War: Voice of America begins to transmit radio broadcasts into Eastern Europe and the Soviet Union.
 February 20
 An explosion at the O'Connor Electro-Plating Company in Los Angeles, California, leaves 17 dead, 100 buildings damaged, and a  crater in the ground.
 Ordnance Corps Hermes project V-2 rocket Blossom I launched into space carrying plant material and fruitflies, the first animals to enter space.
 February 21 – Edwin Land demonstrates the first "instant camera", his Polaroid Land Camera, to a meeting of the Optical Society of America in New York City.
 March 6 – USS Newport News, the first completely air-conditioned warship, is launched in Newport News, Virginia.
 March 13 – The 19th Academy Awards ceremony, hosted by Jack Benny, is held at Shrine Auditorium in Los Angeles. William Wyler's The Best Years of Our Lives receives the most nominations with eight and wins the most awards with seven, including Best Motion Picture and Wyler's second Best Director award.
 March 25 – A coal mine explosion in Centralia, Illinois, kills 111 miners.

April–June
 April 1 – Jackie Robinson signs with the Brooklyn Dodgers, becoming the first African American Major League Baseball player since the 1880s.
 April 6 – The 1st Tony Awards, recognizing achievement in American theater, are awarded at the Waldorf-Astoria Hotel in New York City.
 April 9
 Multiple tornadoes strike Texas, Oklahoma, and Kansas killing 181 and injuring 970.
 The Journey of Reconciliation begins, organized by the Congress of Racial Equality.
 April 15 – Jackie Robinson becomes the first African American to play Major League Baseball since the 1880s.
 April 16
 Texas City Disaster: The ammonium nitrate cargo of French-registered Liberty ship  explodes in Texas City, Texas, killing at least 581, including all but one member of the city fire department, injuring at least 5,000 and destroying 20 city blocks. Of the dead, remains of 113 are never found and 63 are unidentifiable.
 American financier and presidential adviser Bernard Baruch describes the post–World War II tensions between the Soviet Union and the United States as a "Cold War".
 April 26 – Academy award-winning Tom and Jerry cartoon, The Cat Concerto, is released to theatres.
 May 6 – Wisconsin earthquake with a maximum Mercalli intensity of V (Moderate).
 May 22
 Cold War: In an effort to fight the spread of Communism, President Harry S. Truman signs an Act of Congress that implements the Truman Doctrine. This Act grants $400 million in military and economic aid to Turkey and Greece.
 David Lean's film Great Expectations, based on the novel by Charles Dickens, opens in the U.S. Critics call it the finest film ever made from a Charles Dickens novel.
 June – Langer's Deli opens in Los Angeles.
 June 5 – Secretary of State George Marshall outlines the Marshall Plan for American reconstruction and relief aid to Europe.
 June 23 – The United States Senate follows the House of Representatives in overriding President Truman's veto of the Taft-Hartley Act.
 June 24 – Kenneth Arnold makes the first widely reported UFO sighting near Mount Rainier, Washington.  The Arnold sighting marks the start of the 1947 flying disc craze.

July–September
 July 4 – Three crew members aboard United Airlines Flight 105 reported seeing multiple unidentified objects in the skies over the Pacific Northwest
 July 7 – A supposedly downed extraterrestrial spacecraft is reportedly found in the Roswell UFO incident, near Roswell, New Mexico, which will be written about by Stanton T. Friedman and many others. In Arizona, the Rhodes UFO photographs are taken, purportedly showing "shoe-heel"-shaped object in the skies over Phoenix.
 July 11 - A hoaxed flying disc is recovered in Twin Falls
 July 18 – President Truman signs the Presidential Succession Act into law, which places the Speaker of the House and the President Pro Tempore of the Senate next in the line of succession after the Vice President.
 July 26 – Cold War: President Truman signs the National Security Act of 1947 into law, creating the Central Intelligence Agency, the Department of Defense, the Joint Chiefs of Staff, and the National Security Council.
 August – Fernwood Park race riot in Chicago.
 August 1 - A B-25 departing McChord Field bound for Hamilton Field crashes near Kelso, Washington, killing both pilot and co-pilot. It is subsequently revealed that plane was returning from investigating a UFO sighting at Maury Island. Seaman Harold Dahl claims to have seen six UFOs near Maury Island in Puget Sound, Washington on June 21 and reports the first modern so-called "Men in Black" encounter.
 August 29 – US announces the discovery of plutonium fission, suitable for nuclear power generation.
 September 17–21 – The 1947 Fort Lauderdale Hurricane in southeastern Florida, and also in Alabama, Mississippi, and Louisiana, causes widespread damage and kills 51 people.
 September 17 – Office of Indian Affairs renamed Bureau of Indian Affairs.
 September 18 – Most provisions of the National Security Act go into effect, reorganizing the military to form the National Military Establishment (later the Department of Defense) with subordinate Departments of the Army, Navy, and Air Force; creating the Central Intelligence Agency and the National Security Council; and establishing the Secretary of Defense.
 September 26 – U.S. Air Force is made a separate branch of the military.
 September 27 – Walt Disney Productions' ninth feature film, Fun and Fancy Free, is released. It is Disney's fourth of six package films to be released through the 1940s and notably features Walt Disney's final voice role as Mickey Mouse.

October–December

 October–November – Great Fires of 1947: Forest fires in Maine consume more than 200,000 acres of wooded land statewide, including over 17,000 acres on Mount Desert Island alone. 16 persons are killed and more than 1,000 homes destroyed in the blazes, with total property damage exceeding $23 million.
 October – The House Un-American Activities Committee begins its investigations into communism in Hollywood.
 October 6 – World Series games are broadcast on television for the first time.
 The New York Yankees defeat the Brooklyn Dodgers, 4 games to 3, to win their 11th World Series Title.
 October 14 – The United States Air Force test pilot Captain Chuck Yeager flies a Bell X-1 rocket plane faster than the speed of sound, the first time that this has been accomplished in  level flight, or climbing.
 October 20 – Pakistan establishes diplomatic relations with the United States.
 November 1 – U.S. Caribbean Command designated.
 November 2 – In California, designer Howard Hughes pilots the maiden flight of the Hughes H-4 Hercules flying boat known as "Spruce Goose", the largest fixed-wing aircraft ever built; the flight lasts only eight minutes and the craft is never flown again.
 November 6 – The program Meet the Press makes its television debut on the NBC-TV network in the United States.
 November 24 – Red Scare: The U.S. House of Representatives votes 346–17 to approve citations of Contempt of Congress against the so-called Hollywood 10, after the ten men refuse to co-operate with the House Un-American Activities Committee concerning allegations of communist influences in the movie business. (The ten men are blacklisted by the Hollywood movie studios on the following day).
 December 3 – The Tennessee Williams play A Streetcar Named Desire opens in a Broadway theater.
 December 6 – Arturo Toscanini conducts a concert performance of the first half of Giuseppe Verdi's opera Otello, based on Shakespeare's play Othello, for a broadcast on NBC Radio. The second half of the opera is broadcast a week later.
 December 22 – The first practical electronic transistor is demonstrated by John Bardeen and Walter Brattain working under William Shockley at AT&T's Bell Labs.

Ongoing
 Cold War (1947–1991)
 Second Red Scare (1947–1957)
 Baby boom (1946–1964)

Births

January 

 January 1
 Jon Corzine, American politician
 Leon Patillo, American singer and evangelist
 Leonard Thompson, American golfer
 January 2 – Jack Hanna, American zoologist
 January 5 
 Mike DeWine, American politician
 Mercury Morris, American football player
 January 7 – Scott Reid, American baseball player and scout (d. 2021)
 January 8
 William Bonin, American serial killer (d. 1996)
 David Gates, American journalist and novelist
 Laurie Walters, American actress
 January 9 – Ronnie Landfield, American artist
 January 10
 George Alec Effinger, American science fiction author (d. 2002)  
 Afeni Shakur, American music businesswoman (d. 2016)  
 January 15 – Andrea Martin, Canadian-American actress (Second City Television)
 January 16 – Laura Schlessinger, American radio and TV talk show host
 January 19
 Ann Compton, American journalist
 Paula Deen, American Food Channel television personality
 January 21 – Jill Eikenberry, American actress
 January 23
 Tom Carper, American politician
 Joel Douglas, American film producer
 January 24
 Michio Kaku, American theoretical physicist and science popularizer
 Warren Zevon, American rock musician (Werewolves of London) (d. 2003)
 January 25 – Marjorie Scardino, American-born business executive
 January 26 – Mark Dayton, American politician
 January 27 – Cal Schenkel, American illustrator
 January 28 – Jeanne Shaheen, American politician
 January 29
 Linda B. Buck, American biologist, winner of the Nobel Prize in Physiology or Medicine.
 Ernie Lively, American actor (d. 2021)
 January 31
 Jonathan Banks, American actor
 Nolan Ryan, American baseball player
 Glynn Turman, African-American actor

February 

 February 1 – Jessica Savitch, American journalist (d. 1983)
 February 2 – Farrah Fawcett, American actress (Charlie's Angels) (d. 2009)
 February 3
 Paul Auster, American novelist
 Melanie Safka, American rock singer (Candles in the Rain)
 February 4
 Sanford Bishop, African-American politician
 Dennis C. Blair, American admiral, Director of National Intelligence
 Dan Quayle, American politician, 44th Vice President of the United States from 1989 to 1993
 February 5 – Darrell Waltrip, American race car driver, broadcaster
 February 7 – Wayne Allwine, American voice actor (d. 2009)
 February 8 – J. Richard Gott, American astronomer and academic
 February 9 – Erik Olin Wright, American sociologist (d. 2019)
 February 11 – Roy Moore, American politician
 February 13 – Mike Krzyzewski, American basketball coach
 February 15
 John Adams, American composer
 Rusty Hamer, American actor (d. 1990)
 February 18 – Dennis DeYoung, American rock musician (Styx)
 February 20 – Peter Strauss, American actor
 February 24 
 Mike Fratello, basketball player, coach, and sportscaster
 Edward James Olmos, Hispanic-American actor, director, producer and activist
 February 25
 Lee Evans, American Olympic athlete (d. 2021)
 Doug Yule, American rock singer (The Velvet Underground)

March 

 March 4 – David Franzoni, American screenwriter 
 March 5 – Ottis Toole, murderer (d. 1996)
 March 6
 Dick Fosbury, American high-jumper (d. 2023)
 Rob Reiner, American actor, comedian, producer, director and activist (All in the Family) 
 March 8 
 Carole Bayer Sager, American singer, songwriter
 Michael S. Hart, American author, inventor (d. 2011)
 March 10 
 Doug Fisher, American football player (d. 2023)
 Tom Scholz, American musician, songwriter and inventor
 March 11 
David Ferguson, American music producer, activist (d. 2015)
Mark Stein, American singer-songwriter and keyboard player 
 March 12 – Mitt Romney, American politician
 March 14 – William Jefferson, African-American politician
 March 15 – Ry Cooder, American guitarist
 March 19 – Glenn Close, American actress
 March 20 
 John Boswell, American historian (d. 1994)
 Chip Zien, American actor
 March 22
 Babz Chula, American-born Canadian actress (d. 2010)
 James Patterson, American author
 Florence Warner, American singer, voice actress (Once Upon a Forest)
 March 27 
 Walt Mossberg, American newspaper columnist
 Doug Wilkerson, American footballer (d. 2021)
 March 28 –  Paul Jackson, American bassist and composer (d. 2021)

April 

 April 1
 Francine Prose, fiction writer and critic
 Norm Van Lier, basketball player, coach and sportscaster (died 2009)
 April 2
 Emmylou Harris, American country singer-songwriter
 Camille Paglia, American literary critic 
 April 4 – Ray Fosse, baseball player and broadcaster (died 2021)
 April 6 – John Ratzenberger, American actor (Cheers)
 April 8
 Tom DeLay, American conservative politician
 Robert Kiyosaki, American investor, businessman and self-help author
 April 9 – Ken Lewis, CEO, president and chairman of Bank of America
 April 11
 Meshach Taylor, African-American actor (died 2014)
 Lucian Truscott IV, American writer, journalist
 April 12
 Tom Clancy, American author (died 2013)
 Woody Johnson, American businessman and philanthropist
 Dan Lauria, American actor
 David Letterman, American talk show host
 April 15
 Lois Chiles, American actress 
 Roy Raymond, American entrepreneur (Victoria's Secret) (died 1993)
 April 16
 Kareem Abdul-Jabbar, African-American basketball player and actor (Airplane!)
 Frank Hamblen, American basketball coach (died 2017)
 April 18
 Kathy Acker, American author (died 1997)
 James Woods, American actor
 April 19 – Murray Perahia, American pianist
 April 20 – Andrew Tobias, American journalist and author
 April 21 – Iggy Pop, American rock musician
 April 22 – Norma Harris, American sprinter
 April 25
 Richard Bowdry, African-American stock car driver 
 Jeffrey DeMunn, American actor
 April 28 – Ken St. Andre, American game designer and author
 April 29
 Tommy James, American rock singer, producer
 Jim Ryun, American middle-distance runner and Congressman

May 

 May 3 – Richard Jenkins, American actor
 May 4 – Theda Skocpol, American sociologist
 May 6 – Martha Nussbaum, American philosopher
 May 8
 H. Robert Horvitz, American biologist, recipient of the Nobel Prize in Physiology or Medicine
 Jamie Donnelly, American film, stage actress
 May 10 – Jay Ferguson, American singer-songwriter, keyboard player (Spirit and Jo Jo Gunne)
 May 11 – Butch Trucks, American drummer (The Allman Brothers Band) (d. 2017)
 May 13 – Stephen R. Donaldson, American novelist
 May 14 – Tamara Dobson, African-American actress, fashion model (d. 2006)
 May 16 
 Buddy Roberts, American professional wrestler (d. 2012)
 Bill Smitrovich, American actor 
 May 23 – Ken Westerfield, American disc sports (Frisbee) pioneer, athlete, showman and promoter
 May 27 – Peter DeFazio, American politician

June 

 June 3 
 Dave Alexander, American musician (d. 1975)
 John Dykstra, American special effects artist and producer
 June 5 – Laurie Anderson, American experimental performance artist, composer and musician
 June 6 – Robert Englund, American actor, director and singer
 June 7
 Thurman Munson, American baseball player (d. 1979) 
 Edward C. Prado, American judge
 June 8
 Earl Devaney, American Secret Service officer (d. 2022)
 Eric F. Wieschaus, American biologist, recipient of the Nobel Prize in Physiology or Medicine
 June 14 – Barry Melton, American rock musician (Country Joe and the Fish)
 June 15 – John Hoagland, American war photographer (d. 1984)
 June 19 – Linda Myers, American archer
 June 20 – Candy Clark, American actress
 June 21
 Meredith Baxter, American actress (Family Ties) 
 Jim Benzelock, American professional ice hockey right winger
 Michael Gross, American actor (Family Ties) 
 Duane Thomas, American football running back
 June 22
 Bobby Douglass, American football quarterback
 Octavia E. Butler, American author (d. 2006)
 David Lander, American actor (Laverne and Shirley) 
 Pete Maravich, American basketball player (d. 1988
 June 24
 Peter Weller, American actor, director
 Walter Willison, American stage actor
 June 25
 Jimmie Walker, African-American actor (Good Times) 
 John Powell, American track and field athlete
 June 26 – Edd Hargett, American football quarterback
 June 28 – Mark Helprin, American writer
 June 29 
 Brian Herbert, American author 
 Richard Lewis, American comedian, actor (Robin Hood: Men in Tights, Curb Your Enthusiasm)

July 

 July 1 – Marc Benno, American singer, songwriter and guitarist
 July 2 – Larry David, American actor, writer, producer and director (Curb Your Enthusiasm)
 July 3
 Dave Barry, American writer
 Betty Buckley, American actress, singer
 Mike Burton, American swimmer
 July 5 
 Todd Akin, politician (d. 2021)
 Joe Brown, African-American television judge
 Dan Hewitt Owens, American actor
 July 6
 Shelley Hack, American model, actress, producer, political and media advisor
 Larnelle Harris, African-American Christian musician
 July 7
 Randy Goodrum, American songwriter, pianist and producer
 David Hodo, American singer
 Carl Mauck, American football player
 July 8 – Bobby Sowell, American pianist and composer
 July 9 – O. J. Simpson, American football player, sportscaster, actor and author, convicted of causing wrongful death and felony
 July 10 – Arlo Guthrie, American folk singer (Alice's Restaurant) 
 July 12 – Loren Coleman, American cryptozoologist, author
 July 15 – Roky Erickson, American singer-songwriter and musician (d. 2019)
 July 16
 Alexis Herman, American politician
 Assata Shakur, American convicted murder
 July 19 – Bernie Leadon, American musician, songwriter
 July 22
 Albert Brooks, American actor, comedian, director and novelist
 Erica Gavin, American film actress
 Don Henley, American singer, songwriter and musician 
 July 23 – Spencer Christian, American television personality
 July 24 – Peter Serkin, American pianist (d. 2020)
 July 27 – Bob Klein, American football player
 July 30
 William Atherton, American actor
 Arnold Schwarzenegger, Austrian-American actor, bodybuilder and politician
 July 31 – Joe Wilson, American politician

August 

 August 3 – Colleen Corby, fashion model
 August 9 – John Varley, science-fiction author
 August 14 – Danielle Steel, romance novelist
 August 16 – Carol Moseley-Braun, politician
 August 19
 Terry Hoeppner, American football coach (died 2007)
 Gerard Schwarz, conductor
 Gerald McRaney, actor (Major Dad)
 August 22 
 Donna Jean Godchaux, singer-songwriter
 Cindy Williams, actress (Laverne and Shirley)
 August 24 – Joe Manchin, politician
 August 27 
 Harry Reems, pornographic actor (died 2013)
 Barbara Bach, actress 
 August 28 – Alice Playten, actress (died 2011)
 August 29 – Temple Grandin, animal welfare and autism expert

September 

 September 1 – Al Green, politician
 September 5 – Buddy Miles, African-American drummer, singer and composer (d. 2008)
 September 6
 Jane Curtin, actress and comedian
 Keone Young, actor
 September 8 – Benjamin Orr, singer-songwriter (d. 2000)
 September 9 – Freddy Weller, singer-songwriter
 September 14 – William B. Taylor Jr., diplomat
 September 19 – Steve Bartlett, politician
 September 20
 Billy Bang, violinist and composer (d. 2011)
 Jude Deveraux, author
 Chris Ortloff, journalist and politician
 Bruce Pasternack, businessman 
 September 21
 Don Felder, American rock guitarist
 Stephen King, American horror novelist
 September 22 – Norma McCorvey, abortion plaintiff (Roe v. Wade) (d. 2017)
 September 23
 Jerry Corbetta, American singer, songwriter and keyboardist (Sugarloaf) (d. 2016)
 Mary Kay Place, American actress 
 September 25
 Jim Murphy, American author (d. 2022)
 Cheryl Tiegs, American model, actress
 Cecil Womack, African-American singer, songwriter (Womack & Womack) (d. 2013)
 September 26 – Lynn Anderson, American country-music singer (d. 2015)
 September 27 – Meat Loaf, American rock singer, actor

October 

 October 1 – Stephen Collins, American actor 
 October 2 – Ward Churchill, American author and activist
 October 3
 John Perry Barlow, American internet activist, writer and lyricist (d. 2018)
 Fred DeLuca, American entrepreneur, co-founder of Subway (d. 2015)
 October 6 – Gail Farrell, American singer
 October 8 – Stephen Shore, American photographer
 October 13 – Sammy Hagar, American rock musician (Van Halen)
 October 16 – Bob Weir, American rock guitarist
 October 17
 Gene Green, American politician
 Michael McKean, American actor, comedian (Laverne and Shirley) 
 October 18 – James H. Fallon, American neuroscientist
 October 23 – Frank DiLeo, American actor and music industry executive (d. 2011)
 October 24 – Kevin Kline, American actor
 October 26 – Hillary Clinton, First Lady of the United States, 67th Secretary of State
 October 29 – Richard Dreyfuss, American actor
 October 30 – Timothy B. Schmit, American musician

November 

 November 3 – Mazie Hirono, American politician
 November 7 – Bernhard Goetz, American shooter in 1984 subway shooting 
 November 8
 Minnie Riperton, African-American singer (d. 1979)
 Rhea Seddon, astronaut and surgeon
 Lewis Yocum, American orthopedic surgeon (d. 2013)
 November 9 – Phil Driscoll, American Christian musician, trumpet player
 November 10 – Glen Buxton, American rock guitarist (d. 1997)
 November 12 – Ron Bryant, American baseball player
 November 13 
 Toy Caldwell, American guitarist and songwriter (The Marshall Tucker Band) (d. 1993)
 Gene Garber, American baseball player
 Joe Mantegna, American actor
 November 14
 Buckwheat Zydeco, American accordionist (d. 2016)
 P. J. O'Rourke, American journalist, satirist (d. 2022)
 November 15
Steven G. Kellman, American author, critic
Bill Richardson, American politician, governor of New Mexico and  U.S. Ambassador to the United Nations
 November 17 – Will Vinton, American animator, filmmaker (d. 2018) 
 November 18
 Timothy Maude, general (d. 2001)
 Jameson Parker, actor and producer 
 November 19
 Bob Boone, American baseball player, manager
 Lamar S. Smith, American politician
 Ira David Wood III, American actor
 November 20 – Joe Walsh, American rock singer, songwriter and guitarist
 November 24 – Dwight Schultz, American actor (The A-Team)
 November 25 – John Larroquette, American actor (Night Court)
 November 28 – Gustav Hasford, American marine, novelist, journalist, poet and book thief (d. 1993)
 November 30
 Jude Ciccolella, American actor
 David Mamet, American playwright

December 

 December 7
 Johnny Bench, American baseball player
 Wilton Daniel Gregory, African American cardinal
 Jeff Maxwell, American actor (M*A*S*H)
 December 8
 Gregg Allman, American singer-songwriter (d. 2017)
 Thomas R. Cech, American chemist, Nobel Prize laureate
 December 9 – Tom Daschle, American politician
 December 14
 Valerie Bobbett Gardner, violinist, pedagogue, and author
 Christopher Parkening, American classical guitarist
 December 16 – Vincent Matthews, African-American sprinter
 December 17
 Marilyn Hassett, American actress 
 Wes Studi, American actor
 December 18 – Judith Heumann, American disability rights activist (d. 2023)
 December 20 – Bo Ryan, American basketball player and coach
 December 26 – Carlton Fisk, American baseball player
 December 27 – Bob Conti, American percussionist
 December 29 – Ted Danson, American actor (Cheers)
 December 31 – Tim Matheson, American actor, film director and producer

Undated 
 John Christopher Turner, American active in Afghanistan

Deaths

January–June 
 January 3 – Gus Wickie, singer and voice actor (b. 1885)
 January 10 – Arthur E. Andersen, accountant (b. 1885)
 January 14 – Bill Hewitt, football player (Chicago Bears) and member of Pro Football Hall of Fame (b. 1909)
January 16
 Sonny Berman, jazz trumpeter, of suspected drug overdose (b. 1925)
 Fate Marable, jazz pianist and bandleader, of pneumonia (b. 1890)
 January 17 – Janet Cook Lewis, portrait painter, librarian, and bookbinder (b. 1855)
 January 20
 Andrew Volstead, politician (b. 1860)
 Josh Gibson, African-American baseball player and member of MLB Hall of Fame (b. 1911)
 January 25 – Al Capone, gangster (b. 1899)
 January 26 – Grace Moore, operatic soprano, in plane crash (b. 1898)
 February 12
 Kurt Lewin, German-American psychologist (b. 1890)
 Sidney Toler, actor (b. 1874)
 February 22 – Willie Franklin Pruitt, poet and activist (b. 1865)
 March 8 – Victor Potel, character actor and comedian (b. 1889)
 March 9 – Carrie Chapman Catt, women's suffrage leader (b. 1859)
 March 12 – Winston Churchill, novelist (b. 1871)
 March 18 – William C. Durant, automobile pioneer (b. 1861)
 March 21 – Homer Lusk Collyer, one of the reclusive Collyer brothers (b. 1881)
 March 28 – Johnny Evers, baseball player (Chicago Cubs) and member of MLB Hall of Fame (b. 1881)
 April 7 – Henry Ford, automobile manufacturer  (b. 1863)
 April 8 – Langley Collyer, one of the reclusive Collyer brothers (b. 1885)
 April 10 – John Ince, actor (b. 1878)
 April 14 – Herbert Spencer Jennings, zoologist (b. 1868)
 April 24 – Willa Cather, novelist (b. 1873)
 April 29 – Irving Fisher, economist (b. 1867)
 May 3 – Harry Holman, character actor (b. 1872)
 May 6 – Louise Homer, operatic contralto (b. 1871)
 May 8 – Harry Gordon Selfridge, department store magnate (b. 1858)
 May 14 – John R. Sinnock, eighth Chief Engraver of the United States Mint (b. 1888)
 May 18 – Lucile Gleason, actress (b. 1888)
 May 30 – Baron Georg von Trapp, Austrian naval officer, patriarch of the Von Trapp Family Singers (b. 1880)
 May 31 – Adrienne Ames, actress (b. 1907)
 June 9 – J. Warren Kerrigan, actor (b. 1879)
 June 11 – Richard Hönigswald, Hungarian-born philosopher (b. 1875)
 June 17 – Maxwell Perkins, literary editor (b. 1884)
 June 20 – Bugsy Siegel, gangster (b. 1906)
 June 22 – Jim Tully, vagabond, pugilist and writer (b. 1886)

July–December 
 July 12 – Jimmie Lunceford, African-American jazz saxophonist and bandleader, of cardiac arrest (b. 1902)
 July 15
 Walter Donaldson, songwriter (b. 1893)
 Brandon Hurst, stage and screen actor (b. 1866)
 August 3 – Vic Willis, baseball player (Boston Braves) and member of MLB Hall of Fame (b. 1876)
 September 1 – Frederick Russell Burnham, father of the international Scouting movement (b. 1861)
 September 18 – Bert Kalmar, lyricist (b. 1884)
 September 20
 Fiorello La Guardia, Mayor of New York (b. 1882)
 Edward McCartan, sculptor (b. 1879)
 September 21 – Harry Carey, film actor (b. 1878)
 October 1
 Olive Borden, actress (b. 1906)
 James Gamble Rogers, architect (b. 1867)
 October 3 – Ernest L. Riebau, politician (b. 1895)
 October 17 – John Halliday, actor (b. 1880)
 October 29 – Frances Cleveland, First Lady, wife of President Grover Cleveland (b. 1864)
 November 3 
 Nelson McDowell, actor (b. 1870)
 John Gilbert Winant, politician and diplomat, suicide (b. 1889)
 November 4 – Mabel Van Buren, actress (b. 1878)
 November 20 – Walter J. Mathews, California architect (b. 1850)
 November 28 – W. E. Lawrence, silent film actor (b. 1896)
 December 7 – Nicholas Murray Butler, polymath, president of Columbia University and recipient of the Nobel Peace Prize (b. 1862)
 December 22 – Edward Nelson Woodruff, politician (b. 1862)

See also
 List of American films of 1947
 Timeline of United States history (1930–1949)

References

External links
 

 
1940s in the United States
United States
United States
Years of the 20th century in the United States